The 2009 Aaron's 499 was the ninth race of the 2009 NASCAR Sprint Cup season. Fox Sports broadcast the race starting at 1 PM EDT, with MRN and Sirius XM Radio carrying the radio broadcast over the air and on satellite respectively. The race had nine cautions, 25 different leaders, and 57 lead changes, the most lead changes of the season up until that point.

Brad Keselowski, driving for Phoenix Racing, won the race in his fifth career start (third start in 2009) and led his first career Sprint Cup lap, Lap 188 (in fact the only lap he led the entire race), while Dale Earnhardt Jr. finished second and Ryan Newman finished third. It would prove to be the only Cup Series victory for Phoenix Racing. This was the first time since Casey Mears's win at the 2007 Coca-Cola 600 in Charlotte that a driver had won his first career win in a major, and the first win in the Aaron's 499 by a first-time driver since Phil Parsons in 1988. It was also the first time a driver's first ever lap led was to win the race. Keselowski dedicated his win to the late Neil Bonnett.

Background
Talladega Superspeedway is one of six superspeedways to hold NASCAR races; the others are Daytona International Speedway, Auto Club Speedway, Indianapolis Motor Speedway, Pocono Raceway and Michigan International Speedway. The track's turns are banked at thirty-three degrees, while the front stretch, the location of the finish line, is banked at 16.5 degrees. The back stretch has a two-degree banking. Talladega Superspeedway can seat up to 143,231 people.

Before the race, Jeff Gordon led the Drivers' Championship with 1242 points, and Jimmie Johnson stood in second with 1157. Kurt Busch was third in the Drivers' Championship with 1144 points, six ahead of Tony Stewart and 56 ahead of Denny Hamlin in fourth and fifth. In sixth, Clint Bowyer with 1052 points was 26 points ahead of Kyle Busch in seventh, as Carl Edwards with 1023 points was 31 points ahead of David Reutimann, and 48 points in front of Kasey Kahne.

Entry list

Qualifying

Race recap
To begin pre-race events, Jeff Sauls, Chaplain Emergency Crews and Alabama Raceway Ministry, delivered the invocation at 1:00 P.M Central Standard Time (2:00 pm Eastern Standard time). Then Katie Stam, Miss America 2009, performed the national anthem. At 1:08 pm, University of Alabama head football coach, Nick Saban, delivered the starting command.

During the pace laps, Scott Speed made an emergency last-minute pit stop, causing him to start the race 1 lap down, since the Talladega races are impound races. Before the green flag, six drivers (including all four Richard Petty Motorsports cars) had to move to the back of the field due to engine changes: Brad Keselowski, Kasey Kahne, David Stremme, Elliott Sadler, Reed Sorenson, and A. J. Allmendinger. Robby Gordon was also forced to start at the rear as his car height was too low and failed post-qualifying inspection.

At the drop of the green flag at 1:20 pm, polesitter Juan Pablo Montoya claimed the lead and stayed in that position for four laps. On lap 5, Dale Earnhardt Jr. passed him for the lead with drafting help from Denny Hamlin. Earnhardt Jr. led for one lap before being repassed by Montoya.

On lap 7, David Ragan, who had won the Nationwide Series race the day before, took the lead on the back straightaway with the help from Joey Logano, who had assisted Ragan in that win. Moments later, the first caution flag was waved for a huge crash in turn 3. This started when Matt Kenseth, while in the middle groove, moved up in front of Jeff Gordon (driving a retro Pepsi Challenge paint scheme used by Darrell Waltrip in 1983) and made contact, causing the 24 car to wobble and get loose on the high side. Gordon then made contact with David Gilliland, getting him loose, then came down and collected 14 more cars, including Allmendinger, Kahne, Sadler, Casey Mears, Kurt Busch, Mark Martin, Max Papis, Jamie McMurray, Kevin Harvick, Clint Bowyer, Scott Riggs, and Bobby Labonte. Martin, who had won the Phoenix race the previous week, took a very hard hit, as his car went over the hood of Riggs', smashed into the wall driver's side first, and got fishtailed by Kahne as his came to a rest on the infield. Bowyer and Gilliland also went head-on into the outside wall.

Under this caution, Speed got the free pass. Most of the drivers pitted under the caution on lap 9. As the caution period continued, John Andretti, Greg Biffle, and Ryan Newman each led a lap before making their pit stops. When the race restarted on lap 13, Logano claimed the lead. One lap later, Martin Truex Jr. took it away from Logano with help from Earnhardt Jr. Truex Jr. continued to lead until lap 18, when Montoya passed him for it. One lap later, Busch, upon returned after the huge wreck on lap 6, took the lead from Montoya and led a lap before being passed by Hamlin. On lap 22, Jeff Burton took the lead and led for a lap before being passed by Hamlin. Burton repassed him for the lead on lap 24. On lap 27, Busch reclaimed the lead when Burton was shuffled out of line. As this took place, Burton reported having no voltage in his car. One lap later, the second caution was thrown for debris on the track. Burton was penalized for pitting early to replace his car battery.

On the lap 34 restart, Kyle Busch claimed the lead. He led for the next seven laps. On lap 38, Truex Jr. briefly took the lead on the back straightaway before Busch repassed him with a shove from Michael Waltrip. In the middle of the next lap, Truex Jr. passed Ky. Busch, but lost the lead coming into the tri-oval.  On lap 40, Ky. Busch, assisted by David Ragan, was travelling alongside Jimmie Johnson, who was being pushed by David Stremme. On lap 41, Ky. Busch, pushed by Speed, raced side-by-side with Johnson, who was being pushed by Earnhardt Jr. On lap 42, the third caution flag waved when Michael Waltrip cut down in front of Marcos Ambrose in the tri-oval and spun out. Waltrip saved his car and barely avoided hitting the inside retaining wall. The free pass went to Allmendinger, 22 laps down after being involved in the first crash.

During the pit stops, Scott Speed stayed out for a lap to claim the lead from Kyle Busch, but returned it to him when he pitted on lap 45. The race restarted on lap 46 with Busch leading. Busch led for two laps before being passed by Earnhardt Jr. on lap 48. Earnhardt Jr. and Martin Truex Jr. had such a run that they were able to get a few seconds ahead of the main pack. Eanrhardt Jr. led until he was passed by Matt Kenseth on the inside on lap 50. Kenseth led for three laps before Earnhardt Jr. repassed him. Earnhardt Jr. continued to lead for the next seven laps. On lap 60, the fourth caution waved when Kurt Busch spun out in the tri-oval after being touched in the left-rear by David Stremme. his spin happened in exactly the same spot that Waltrip's pin happened in to bring out the previous caution. He also saved his car. During this caution, Kevin Harvick, Jeff Gordon, and Kasey Kahne all returned to the track multiple laps down after repairs from the big crash. Under the caution, Jeff Burton received the free pass. Waltrip led for a lap during the caution before pitting and giving the lead to Martin Truex Jr. At the restart on lap 64, Truex Jr. led the field to the green flag.

The Top 4 drivers — Truex Jr.; Sadler; Earnhardt Jr.; and Kyle Busch —were able to get a strong start and pull away from the lead pack. Truex Jr. led until he was passed on the inside by Hamlin on lap 75. Two laps later, Montoya took the lead. He led for one lap before being passed by Earnhardt Jr., who had a shove from David Stremme. Two laps later, Jimmie Johnson claimed the lead with a shove from Earnhardt Jr. Johnson led for one lap before being passed by Hamlin. On lap 82, Earnhardt Jr. and his JR Motorsports driver Brad Keselowski got together on the back straightaway and went below the yellow line. Though Earnhardt Jr. was able to blend back into the field, Keselowski ended up losing the draft and fell all the way to the back of the lead pack. On lap 83, Sam Hornish Jr. took the lead.

Two laps later, debris on the back straightaway brought out the fifth caution of the day. Most of the drivers pitted under the caution, while Jeff Burton received the free pass. Joe Nemechek led one lap before pitting, while Paul Menard stayed out and led the field to the restart on lap 88. Menard was passed one lap later by Denny Hamlin, who had help from Joey Logano. Hamlin led for two laps before Jimmie Johnson passed him on lap 92. Johnson led for a lap before Hamlin repassed him. On lap 100, the field began to run side by side, led by Hamlin on the outside as Casey Mears led a line on the inside. On Lap 111, Earnhardt Jr. and a lap-down Jeff Burton hooked up and got such a run they were able to get a five-second lead over the main pack for a few laps. Burton was attempting to get back on the lead lap the hard way. On lap 112, Menard pitted, followed a lap later by Reed Sorenson.

On lap 114, Earnhardt Jr.'s runaway lead vanished as Martin Truex Jr. claimed the lead, and Earnhardt Jr. fell back to 11th place. Truex Jr. led until lap 116, when he was passed by Joey Logano, who was repassed by Truex Jr. a lap later. On lap 119, Burton got back on the tail end of the lead lap. On lap 121, Brian Vickers passed Truex Jr. for the lead. Vickers led two laps before Truex Jr. repassed him with a push from Kyle Busch. One lap later, the sixth caution came out for debris. On lap 125, under caution, Carl Edwards claimed the lead as the leaders pitted. Jeremy Mayfield also stayed out. Both Edwards and Mayfield pitted one lap later and gave the lead to Kyle Busch, who had won the race off pit road.

Kyle Busch led the field to the green flag on lap 127. The field shuffled around during the next seven laps, with Busch and Hamlin swapping the lead several times in the middle of the track on lap 132. On lap 134, Elliott Sadler claimed the lead with help from Brad Keselowski. Sadler led for three laps before Kurt Busch passed him with help from Earnhardt Jr. On lap 140, Hamlin pushed David Reutimann to the lead, but went around Reutimann at the finish line to lead the lap. One lap later, Casey Mears claimed the lead. He led until lap 143 when Jeff Burton passed him with assistance from Earnhardt Jr., who took the lead from Burton on the next lap on the middle groove. Kurt Busch passed Earnhardt Jr. on lap 145, and led one lap before Earnhardt Jr. repassed him.

On lap 146, the seventh caution came out for debris. Under the yellow flag, Jeremy Mayfield stayed out to collect five bonus points for leading a lap as most of the drivers took their final pit stops of the day. Kurt Busch led the field to the green flag on lap 150. He led for four laps before his brother passed him with help from Earnhardt Jr. Busch led for fifteen laps before Matt Kenseth passed him on lap 169. Kenseth led for a lap before Busch repassed him. On lap 171, the eighth caution came out when Busch and Truex crashed in turn 3. It began when Jeff Burton made contact with Busch's rear bumper, causing him to wobble, and eventually spin out after contact from Montoya, while behind them, Truex got turned loose by Ragan.

Matt Kenseth claimed the lead and led the field to the green flag on lap 175. One lap later, Hamlin got loose but saved his car, and teamed up with Ryan Newman to make a run past the leaders, allowing Newman to take the lead from Kenseth two laps later. On lap 180, the ninth caution flag was waved for a large crash on the back straightaway. It started when Montoya, running in the middle of the lead pack, was touched by Hamlin, causing Montoya to spin into Bobby Labonte and collected seven more cars, including Martin Truex Jr., Robby Gordon, David Stremme, Jeremy Mayfield, Jimmie Johnson, Michael Waltrip, and Sam Hornish Jr. Gordon took the worst of it, as his car was sent head on into inside wall, stoving in the entire front portion of his car. Newman continued to lead at the restart on lap 184, drafting with Earnhardt Jr.

Carl Edwards passed Newman for the lead to take the white flag on lap 187, pushed by Brad Keselowski. Edwards and Keselowski were ahead of Newman, who was being pushed by Earnhardt Jr. heading down the back straightaway. Coming into the tri-oval, Edwards attempted to block Keselowski, and Keselowski made contact with Edwards' left rear quarter panel. Edwards spun backwards and went airborne. Earnhardt Jr. slipped past Edwards on the inside, and Edwards' airborne car was struck head-on by Newman. This second hit propelled Edwards higher and sent him flying straight into the catch fence. Eight fans were injured by flying debris; the most serious one being a woman whose jaw was broken, and was airlifted to a nearby hospital.

No other cars except Newman had been in the vicinity of Edwards' car, and all of the cars behind him made it past without incident, although Greg Biffle came very close to hitting Edwards. After a few moments, Edwards climbed out of his car and jogged to the finish line to a standing ovation from the crowd, which Mike Joy described as having "shades of Ricky Bobby". Although Edwards did cross the start-finish line but on foot, it still did not count as a successful finish since his car did not cross the finish line and he was handed a DNF in 24th position. When Edwards was interviewed on Larry King Live, he responded, "I'm kind of a Will Ferrell fan. He did that at the end of Talladega Nights."

Race results

Aftermath of the last lap crash
In the wake of the crash, the catch fence was raised by 10 feet and was strengthened for the fall race in order to prevent such an incident from occurring again. In addition, NASCAR implemented a rule for the fall race at Talladega in which drivers were not allowed to bump draft in the corners as an attempt to reduce multicar crashes that often took place at that part of the track. Finally, in 2010, the wing on the Car of Tomorrow was replaced by a spoiler due to its role in Edwards' crash, as well as other wrecks in which the wing provided enough aerodynamic lift to render the roof flaps useless. NASCAR on Fox analyst Darrell Waltrip compared Edwards' crash to a one in 1987, when Bobby Allison blew a tire and went into the catchfence near the start/finish line, ripping out several feet of it and injuring several fans. That crash made NASCAR mandate restrictor plates at Daytona and Talladega to slow down the cars from such extremely high speeds. Although Edwards quickly congratulated Keselowski for the win, the two drivers began a rivalry that heated up almost every year. After a few incidents in the NNS with Keselowski in 2009 they were given a warning by NASCAR on their bitter feelings.

Almost a year later, in the closing laps of the Kobalt Tools 500 at Atlanta, Edwards (a few laps down after an accident with him early in the race) intentionally rushed for Keselowski's bumper and turned him. This was a wreck that resembled what Keselowski did to Edwards at Talladega the previous year. Keselowski climbed out mostly unscathed, and with an injured leg, he limped down the track to the ambulance. Not long after the crash when reviewing radio quotes, NASCAR black-flagged Edwards for the finish after finding out that Edwards did intentionally turn Keselowski. Later that year, Edwards was leading a Nationwide Series race at Gateway Raceway when Keselowski, who said during a red-flag period that he had the fastest car, bumped him in turn 1 of the final lap to take the lead. In return, Edwards spun Keselowski into the pack in turn 4 of the final lap, causing in a multiple car collision and won the race. Keselowski was rammed hard by charging cars and spun in circles. Keselowski climbed out with minor injuries and a grimace on his face and in victory lane, Edwards confessed publicly that the crash was not an accident. When interviewed, Keselowski furiously said, "I found a way to beat him but he just wrecked me ... it is not cool when I wreck on the straightaway going over 180 miles per hour. I am sure Edwards will think about how great he is or how cool he is in his own little mind but that is not reality." That week, Edwards and Keselowski met with NASCAR, who penalized both drivers' points for the Nationwide Series championship standings, fined them both $25,000, and requested them to calm down the rivalry or face indefinite suspension from the sport. Their rivalry did not end until the 2012 Nationwide race at Watkins Glen, where the two rivals finished 1-2 and confirmed it in both their interviews.

References

Aaron's 499
Aaron's 499
NASCAR races at Talladega Superspeedway
April 2009 sports events in the United States